Teuvo ("Ted") Tapio Ahti (born 1934) is a Finnish botanist and lichenologist. He has had a long career at the University of Helsinki that started in 1963, and then following his retirement in 1997, at the Botanical Museum of the Finnish Museum of Natural History. Known as a specialist of the lichen family Cladoniaceae, Ahti has published more than 280 scientific publications. A Festschrift was dedicated to him in 1994, and in 2000 he was awarded the prestigious Acharius Medal for lifetime contributions to lichenology.

Education and career
Ahti started developing an interest in botany at the age of 15, when he worked on a class project involving collecting 100 species of plants. His attention turned to lichens when a classmate who had worked for Veli Räsänen pointed them out during a birdwatching excursion in Helsinki. His interest was further fuelled when a couple of years later, he had to pass a test on identification of forest floor lichens and bryophytes as part of an application for work at the Finnish Forest Research Institute. He honed his identification skills during another summer job a few years later inventorying reindeer in Lapand. In 1957, he was hired by the provincial Government of Newfoundland to undertake a study of caribou habitat. He collected 3500 specimens from nearly 80 localities across the province; these collections were later used as data in several floristic articles dealing with various lichen taxa.

Ahti studied natural science at the University of Helsinki, from where he earned an MSc in 1957, and a PhD in 1961. His thesis was entitled "Taxonomic studies on reindeer lichens (Cladonia, subgenus Cladina)". He started employment in 1964 at the University of Helsinki Botanical Garden with the title Curator of Cryptogams, eventually working up to Deputy Head Curator of Phanerogams during 1965–1968, and then Head Curator of the Division of Cryptogams in 1969. In 1979, Ahti became a professor of Cryptogamic Taxonomy at the University of Helsinki, and a Research Professor at the Academy of Finland in 1991. Since retiring in 1996, Ahti has been a research associate with the Finnish Museum of Natural History in Helsinki.

Ahti was president of the International Association for Lichenology from 1975–1981. In addition to numerous research trips within Europe, he has also been to Asia, and North and South America. His Arctic lichen research expeditions have taken him to locations such as the Murmansk Coast, the northeast coast of Iceland, and the Sakha Republic (Russian Arctic). One of his favourite exotic locations was the tepui mountains of the Venezuelan Guayana, reachable only by helicopter. As of 2017, Ahti had more than 280 publications dealing with lichens, mosses, fungi, and phytogeography. Known as a specialist of the Cladoniaceae, he wrote a monograph on this subject for the journal series Flora Neotropica, which reviewer William Culberson called "the long-awaited fulfillment of an old promise by one of the world's master taxonomists." In the monograph, Ahti accepted 184 species of Cladoniaceae from the Neotropical realm, including 29 new taxa. Ahti made the numerous publications of William Nylander generally accessible through a five-volume reprint edition. He has also made the subject of botany and lichens more popular and accessible to the general public through his work with the Nordic Lichen Flora, a series of books describing all lichens found in Nordic countries.

Teuvo Ahti is married to botanist Leena Hämet-Ahti, who he met while they were both completing their MSc degrees. They married in 1960, and had a "honeymoon" in Wells Gray Provincial Park (central British Columbia, Canada), where they collected several thousands of specimens of plants, mosses, liverworts, and lichens. In 1967, they collected 3000 specimens of vascular plants in Alaska, the Yukon, northern British Columbia, and Alberta.

Recognition
A Festschrift was dedicated to Ahti in 1994 for his 60th birthday, titled Focus on Lichen Taxonomy and Biogeography: A Festschrift in Honour of Teuvo Ahti. This publication, part of the Acta Botanica Fennica series, contains 30 scientific papers written by 45 authors. Ahti was awarded the Acharius Medal in 2000, which is given for lifetime achievement in lichenology. He is an honorary member of the Russian Botanical Society of the Russian Academy of Sciences. In 2011, Ahti, along with co-authors , Katileena Lohtander, and Leena Myllys, won the Tieto-Finlandia Award for their non-fiction work Suomen jäkäläopas ("Finnish lichen guide").

Eponymy
Four genera and several species have been named to honour Ahti. These include:

Ahtia ; Ahtiana ; Teuvoa ; Teuvoahtiana ; Parmelia ahtii ; Lecanora ahtii ; Cladonia ahtii ; Caloplaca ahtii ; Physma ahtianum ; Ramalina ahtii ; Stenocybe ahtii ; Thelotrema ahtii ; Tuckneraria ahtii ; Unguiculariopsis ahtii ; Hypotrachyna ahtiana ; Melanelixia ahtii ; Dactylospora ahtii ; Neolamya ahtii ; Stigmidium ahtii ; Verrucaria ahtii ; and Halecania ahtii .

Selected publications
A complete listing of Ahti's scientific publications up to 2017 is given in Belyaeva and Chamberlain's tribute. Some of his major works include:

References

Cited literature
 

1934 births
Living people
20th-century Finnish botanists
Finnish lichenologists
Acharius Medal recipients
University of Helsinki alumni
Academic staff of the University of Helsinki
Members of the Russian Academy of Sciences
21st-century Finnish botanists
Finnish taxonomists